Sir William Thackeray Marriott  (1834 – 27 July 1903), was a British barrister and Liberal and later Conservative politician who sat in the House of Commons from 1880 to 1893.

Life
Marriott was the third son of Christopher Marriott, of Crumpsall, and his wife Jane Dorothea, daughter of John Poole. He was educated at St John's College, Cambridge. He was ordained deacon in 1858 and became curate of St George's, Hulme, where he was a supporter of the rights of the working classes. However, he declined to take priest's orders for conscientious reasons the following year. Marriott instead entered Lincoln's Inn in 1861 and was called to the Bar in 1864. He established a successful legal practice and was appointed a Queen's Counsel in 1877 and elected a Bencher of Lincoln's Inn in 1879. In 1880 he entered Parliament for Brighton as a Liberal. However, he soon became disillusioned with the Liberal leadership and his 1884 pamphlet "The Liberal Party and Mr Chamberlain" led to a bitter personal controversy with Joseph Chamberlain. He also attacked William Ewart Gladstone's policies in Egypt. In 1884 he resigned his seat in the House of Commons and offered himself for re-election as a Conservative, and was re-elected in March 1884.

When the Conservatives came to power in 1885 under Lord Salisbury, Marriott was sworn of the Privy Council and appointed Judge Advocate General, a post he held until the government fell in 1886. He held the same office in Salisbury's 1886-1892 administration and was knighted in 1888. From 1887 to 1888 he was a counsel for Isma'il Pasha, the deposed former Khedive of Egypt, in his lawsuit against the Egyptian government, and secured him a compensation of £1.2m. In 1892 he became Chancellor of the Primrose League and was one of the main organiser behind a petition against the 1893 Irish Home Rule Bill brought forward by Gladstone. The latter year Marriott resigned his seat in Parliament in order to resume a legal career. He later emigrated to South Africa.

Marriott married Charlotte Louisa, daughter of Captain Tennant, of Need wood House, Hampshire, in 1872. He died in July 1903.

References

External links 
 

1834 births
1903 deaths
Alumni of St John's College, Cambridge
Conservative Party (UK) MPs for English constituencies
Liberal Party (UK) MPs for English constituencies
Members of Lincoln's Inn
Members of the Privy Council of the United Kingdom
UK MPs 1880–1885
UK MPs 1885–1886
UK MPs 1886–1892